Lai Chi Shan is a village in Tai Po District, Hong Kong.

Administration
Lai Chi Shan is a recognised village under the New Territories Small House Policy. It is one of the villages represented within the Tai Po Rural Committee. For electoral purposes, Lai Chi Shan is part of the Tai Po Kau constituency, which is currently represented by Patrick Mo Ka-chun.

History
At the time of the 1911 census, the population of Lai Chi Shan was 97. The number of males was 40.

References

External links

 Delineation of area of existing village Lai Chi Shan (Tai Po) for election of resident representative (2019 to 2022)

Villages in Tai Po District, Hong Kong